Acrotaeniostola spiralis is a species of tephritid or fruit flies in the genus Acrotaeniostola of the family Tephritidae.

Distribution
Bangladesh, Laos, Malaysia, Indonesia.

References

Tephritinae
Insects described in 1935
Diptera of Asia